The 2017–18 Marist Red Foxes men's basketball team represented Marist College during the 2017–18 NCAA Division I men's basketball season. The Red Foxes, led by fourth year head coach Mike Maker, played their home games at the McCann Arena in Poughkeepsie, New York as members of the Metro Atlantic Athletic Conference. They finished the season 6–25, 4–14 in MAAC play to finish in a tie for tenth place. They lost in the first round of the MAAC tournament to Fairfield.

On March 5, 2018, head coach Mike Maker was fired. He finished at Marist with a four-year record of 28–97. Marist hired Saint Peter's head coach John Dunne as Maker's successor on April 3.

Previous season 

The Red Foxes finished the 2016–17 season 8–24, 5–15 in MAAC play to finish in a tie for tenth place. They lost in the first round of the MAAC tournament to Canisius.

Roster

Schedule and results

|-
!colspan=9 style=|Non-conference regular season

|-
!colspan=9 style=|MAAC regular season

|-
!colspan=9 style=| MAAC tournament

See also
2017–18 Marist Red Foxes women's basketball team

References

Marist Red Foxes men's basketball seasons
Marist